Hospříz is a municipality and village in Jindřichův Hradec District in the South Bohemian Region of the Czech Republic. It has about 400 inhabitants.

Administrative parts
The village of Hrutkov is an administrative part of Hospříz.

Gallery

References

Villages in Jindřichův Hradec District